Vitreorana uranoscopa is a species of frog in the family Centrolenidae. It is found in southeastern and southern Brazil, from Minas Gerais and Espírito Santo southward to northern Rio Grande do Sul, and in northeastern Argentina; it is also likely to be found in adjacent Paraguay. Common name Humboldt's grass frog has been proposed for it.

It is typically found in the immediate vicinity of running water, usually clinging close to leaves of herbaceous vegetation and trees. The eggs are deposited on leaves above water, to which the tadpoles drop upon hatching. It can be a locally common species. It is not threatened as a species, but probable threats to it relate to habitat loss caused by clear-cutting, dams, tourism, and human settlement. It is present in several protected areas.

References

uranoscopa
Amphibians of Argentina
Amphibians of Brazil
Amphibians described in 1924
Taxa named by Lorenz Müller
Taxonomy articles created by Polbot